The Steamboat Institute is a conservative nonprofit organization located in Steamboat Springs, Colorado. It was founded in 2008 by Rick and Jennifer Schubert-Akin. The organization's stated mission is to "promote America's first principles and inspire active involvement in the defense of liberty." The Steamboat Institute sponsors an annual conference. Speakers have included former United States Secretary of the Interior Ryan Zinke. The organization also awards an annual journalism fellowship named in honor of Tony Blankley.

According to DeSmog, the organization "has regularly provided a platform for climate change deniers and fossil fuel proponents to spread their messages."

References

External links 
 

2008 establishments in Colorado
Conservative organizations in the United States
Non-profit organizations based in Colorado
Political and economic think tanks in the United States
Think tanks established in 2008